A Hundred Things Keep Me Up at Night is the second studio album from Swedish indie-pop group Love Is All.

Track listing
 New Beginnings
 Give It Back
 Movie Romance
 Last Choice
 Sea Sick
 Wishing Well
 When Giants Fall
 Rumours
 Big Bangs, Black Holes, Meteorites
 A More Uncertain Future
 19 Floors

2008 albums
Love Is All albums
What's Your Rupture? albums